The Chetek Alert is a weekly newspaper published in the Barron County, Wisconsin city of Chetek since September 15, 1882. It has been owned by Jim Bell since 2011.

References

External links 
Official website

Barron County, Wisconsin
Newspapers published in Wisconsin
Weekly newspapers published in the United States
Publications established in 1882